Danila Andreyevich Prokhin (born 24 May 2001) is a Russian football player. He plays as a centre-back for Rostov.

Club career
He made his debut in the Russian Football National League for FC Zenit-2 Saint Petersburg on 13 April 2019 in a game against FC Baltika Kaliningrad.

He made his debut for the senior squad of Zenit on 30 October 2019 in a Russian Cup game against FC Tom Tomsk. He made his Russian Premier League debut for the club on 11 July 2020 in a game against FC Akhmat Grozny, as a starter.

On 22 February 2021, he joined PFC Sochi on loan until the end of the 2021–22 season.

On 5 June 2021, FC Rostov bought out his rights from FC Zenit Saint Petersburg and he signed a long-term contract with Rostov. For the 2021–22 season, he was loaned back to PFC Sochi.

Honours
Zenit Saint Petersburg
Russian Premier League: 2019–20, 2020–21
Russian Cup: 2019–20

Career statistics

Club

References

External links
 
 Profile by Russian Football National League
 
 

2001 births
People from Kirishi
Living people
Russian footballers
Russia youth international footballers
Russia under-21 international footballers
Association football defenders
FC Zenit-2 Saint Petersburg players
FC Zenit Saint Petersburg players
PFC Sochi players
FC Rostov players
Russian Premier League players
Russian First League players
Russian Second League players
Sportspeople from Leningrad Oblast